The Bueyeros School is a historic school building located on State Road 102 in Bueyeros, New Mexico. The school was built in 1936 by the Works Progress Administration as part of its efforts to combat rural unemployment in New Mexico. The Bueyeros area was part of New Mexico's section of the Dust Bowl, making the school project especially important to the area. The school was one of many rural schools built by the WPA in New Mexico; as may rural school districts lacked adequate facilities, school projects were a large and necessary part of the WPA's work in the state. The school has a plain Pueblo Revival design with a stucco exterior and stone drainage spouts on the east side.

The school was added to the National Register of Historic Places on March 15, 1996.

See also

National Register of Historic Places listings in Harding County, New Mexico

References

School buildings on the National Register of Historic Places in New Mexico
Pueblo Revival architecture in New Mexico
School buildings completed in 1936
Buildings and structures in Harding County, New Mexico
National Register of Historic Places in Harding County, New Mexico